The following lists events that happened during 2008 in the Kingdom of Spain.

Incumbents
 Monarch: Juan Carlos I
 Prime Minister: José Luis Rodríguez Zapatero

Events

March
March 9 - José Luis Rodríguez Zapatero is reelected as Prime Minister after defeating Mariano Rajoy.

April
April 5 - Greenpeace announces that in November 2007 a radioactive leak was reported at the Ascó Nuclear Power Plant, but it was kept hidden from the press.

August
August 20 - Spanair flight 5022  crashed just after takeoff from runway 36L of Barajas Airport, killing 154 of the 166 people on board.

December
 December 31 - A truck-bomb explodes near the EITB headquarters in Bilbao.

Date unknown
942 Dakar, historia de una familia, a documentary film is released.

Births
11 August - Levi Díaz, Singer

Deaths
May 3: Leopoldo Calvo-Sotelo, Prime Minister (1981–82)

See also
 2008 in Spanish television
 List of Spanish films of 2008

References

 
Spain
Years of the 21st century in Spain
2000s in Spain
Spain